A bauble may be:

 Memorabilia
 Christmas ornament - British English 
 trinket
 knickknack or Bric-à-brac
 frippery
 gewgaw
 tchotchke
 small jewelry

Memorabilia